Gabriel Schillinger (born July 21, 1989) is an entrepreneur from Delray Beach, Florida. He was the co-founder and executive director of For Darfur. In 2009 he founded Decade Worldwide and BIM Networks. He worked with Lars Rasmussen, the visionary co-creator of Google Maps, at Weav Music. In July 2017, he co-founded Gamma Innovations. Gamma Innovations was acquired by Animoca Brands in July 2019.

Early childhood and education
Schillinger was born on July 21, 1989 in Delray Beach, Florida. His mother, Mary Lou Schillinger, worked as an occupational therapist. His father Brent Schillinger, is a Board Certified Dermatologist in Palm Beach County, Florida. His brother is Bloomberg video producer Raymond Schillinger.

He attended Saint Andrew's School in Boca Raton. At the age of 16, Schillinger co-founded For Darfur. He spent his summers traveling South America learning Spanish. Schillinger attended Babson College and New York University

For Darfur 

Schillinger produced and promoted Kanye West's Glow in The Dark Tour at the AmericanAirlines Arena in Miami, Florida. The concert was an awareness and fundraising show. The concert was a success with a sellout crowd of 12,000 people and raised over $1,000,000 that went directly to Doctors Without Borders efforts in Darfur.

Career

Decade Worldwide 
Schillinger co-founded Decade Worldwide. Schillinger was instrumental in pioneering the concept of a mixtape portal, allowing artists to release their mixtapes through a central branded website. Past releases for Decade, under Schillinger's leadership, include Wale's More About Nothing Mixtape and Diggy Simmons early mixtapes in 2009 and 2010.

BIM Networks 

Schillinger co-founded Buy It Mobility Networks, Inc in 2009, with Benjamin Bronfman. Edgar Bronfman Jr. is the Chairman on the company and board members include Robert Nardelli, Stephen Sadove, Tom Neff, Arthur Martinez. BIM is mobile payments platform that offers a decoupled debit and rewards product to quick service retailers and gas stations. Schillinger successfully sold his stake and exited BIM in 2013. BIM currently has major United States gas stations as partners including Philip's 76

Weav 

Schillinger worked with Lars Rasmussen for the launch of Weav Music in 2016 and was an advisor to Weav until June 2017. Weav is an adaptive music technology app that automatically matches songs to users cadence while running. Schillinger helped bring investors and partners to Weav, opening up the company to the music and sports industries.

Gamma Innovations

Schillinger co-founded Gamma Innovations with Samuel Snyder and Zhi Huang in July 2017. Gamma's investors included David Helgason, Mark Pincus, Greycroft, Lars Rasmussen, Gree, Razer and others. Gamma launched GammaNow, a distributed compute application inspired by SETI@home in February 2018. Gamma announced on December 2nd, 2018 a strategic partnership with Razer to release Softminer, a white labeled version of GammaNow, to the Razer community globally. Gamma has users in over forty countries. It was announced in July 2019, that Gamma would be acquired by Animoca Brands.

References

External links
For Darfur Inc.
Decade Worldwide
Diggy "Airborne"
Wale "More About Nothing"
"bimnetworks"

1989 births
Living people
People from Palm Beach, Florida
American humanitarians
People from Delray Beach, Florida